Edaiyar  is a village in the  
Aranthangirevenue block of Pudukkottai district, Tamil Nadu, India.

Demographics 

As per the 2001 census, Edaiyar had a total population of  
569 with 289 males and 280 females. Out of the total population 381 people were literate.

References

Villages in Pudukkottai district